The Roman Catholic Diocese of Bunia is a diocese located in the city of Bunia  in the Ecclesiastical province of Kisangani in the Democratic Republic of the Congo.

History
 June 27, 1922: Established as Apostolic Prefecture of Lake Albert from the Apostolic Vicariate of Stanley Falls and the Apostolic Vicariate of Uganda in Uganda 
 December 11, 1933: Promoted as Apostolic Vicariate of Lake Albert
 November 10, 1959: Promoted as Diocese of Bunia

Leadership, in reverse chronological order
 Bishops of Bunia (Latin Rite), below
 Bishop Dieudonné Uringi Uuci (since 2005.04.01)
 Bishop Léonard Dhejju (1984.07.02 – 2002.04.06)
 Bishop Gabriel Ukec (1964.09.29 – 1984.07.02)
 Bishop Alphonse Joseph Matthijsen, M. Afr. (1959.11.10 – 1963.08.19); see below''''
 Vicar Apostolic of Lake Albert (Latin Rite), below
 Bishop Alphonse Joseph Matthijsen, M. Afr. (1933.12.11 – 1959.11.10); see above & below Prefect Apostolic of Lake Albert (Latin Rite), below
 Father Alphonse Joseph Matthijsen, M. Afr. (1922.06.21 – 1933.12.11); see above''

See also
Roman Catholicism in the Democratic Republic of the Congo

Sources
 GCatholic.org
 Catholic Hierarchy

Bunia
Roman Catholic dioceses in the Democratic Republic of the Congo
Christian organizations established in 1922
Roman Catholic dioceses and prelatures established in the 20th century
Roman Catholic Ecclesiastical Province of Kisangani